The men's 90 kg weightlifting competitions at the 1964 Summer Olympics in Tokyo took place on 17 October at the Shibuya Public Hall. It was the fourth appearance of the middle heavyweight class.

Results

References

Weightlifting at the 1964 Summer Olympics